The 2018 Uzbekistan Cup was the 26th season of the annual Uzbekistan Cup, the knockout football cup competition of Uzbekistan.

A total of 26 teams participate in the tournament. The cup winner is guaranteed a place in the 2019 AFC Champions League.

Preliminary round
The matches were played on 2 April 2018.

02/04/18

Nurafshon 1 - 3 Ithichor

Sherdor 1 - 1 (aet; 7 - 6 p) Labsa

Round of 32
The draw for the round of 32 was held on 28 February 2018. Lokomotiv, Nasaf, Pakhtakor and Bunyodkor received byes before the draw.

The matches were played on 15–16 April 2018.

15/04/18

Lokomotiv BFK 0 - 4 Surkhon

Khotira-79 0 - 1 (aet) Dinamo Samarqand

Zaamin 2 - 3 (aet) Kokand-1912

Sherdor-Presstizh 3 - 2 Xorazm

Mash'al	1 - 0 Istiklol

Sogdiana 1 - 0 Metalourg

AGMK 1 - 0 Norin

Andijan 1 - 0 Navbahor

16/04/18

Aral Nukus 5 - 1 G'ijduvon

Iftixor 1 - 0 Yozyovon

Shortan 0 - 2 Neftchi

Qizilqum 3 - 2 (aet) Buxoro

Round of 16
The draw for the round of 16 was held on 18 April 2018.

The matches were played on 28–30 May 2018.

Quarter-finals
The draw for the quarter-finals was held on 10 July 2018.

The matches were played on 18–19 September 2018.

Semi-finals
The matches will be played on 27–28 September 2018.

Final
The final was played on 28 October 2018 at the Istiqlol Stadium, Fergana.

External links

Uzbek Cup News, (Russian)
Uzbek Cup Results, (Russian)
Soccerway.com

References

Cup
Uzbekistan Cup
Uzbekistan Cup